Braty Hadiukiny, or simply Hady is a Ukrainian rock band from Lviv, one of the most successful Ukrainian bands of Soviet times. The band's musical style combines different genres such as rock'n'roll, blues, punk, reggae, funk and folk. Ironic song lyrics contain a lot of local vernacularisms, slang and surzhyk. The name translates as "Hadyukin Brothers", where the fictional last name Hadyukin is derived from the word hadyuka, or "viper". The abbreviation literally means "snakes" (In Ukrainian the two words are cognates.)

The band was active mainly between 1988 and 1996. In January 2006 they held a big solo concert in Kyiv which was a big event in Ukrainian media space and was visited by a lot of famous people (including Yulia Tymoshenko the prime minister at the time). After the band's leader Serhiy Kuzminskyi died in 2009 a big tribute concert was held in 2011, joined by prominent Ukrainian rock musicians such as Komu Vnyz, Vopli Vidoplyasova, Okean Elzy and others. In 2014 the rest of the band members released a new album (the first one since 1996).

Members 
Current
 Ihor Melnychuk (Ігор «Ковбаса» Мельничук) — bass, vocals. 
 Pavlo Krakhmal'ov (Павло Крахмальов) — keyboards, vocals.
 Henadiy Verbianyi (Генадій «Геша» Вербяний) — guitar.
 Mykhailo Lundin (Михайло «Лузя» Лундін) — drums, back vocals
 Liliya Pavlyk-Kuvaldina (Лілія Павлик-Кувалдіна) — back vocals.
 Olena Romanovska (Олена Романовська) — back vocals.
 Andriy Skachko (Андрій Скачко) — guitar (new)
 Anton Buryko (Антон Бурико) — trumpet (new)
 Volodymyr Pushkar (Володимир Пушкар) — trombone (new)
 Nazar Vachevskyi (Назар Вачевський) — saxophone (new)

Past
 Serhiy Kuzminskyi (Сергій «Кузя» Кузьмінський) — vocals, keyboards, lyrics, music (1987-1996)
 Oleksandr Yemets (Олександр «Шуля» Ємець) — saxophone, lyrics, music (1987-1989)
 Oleksandr Hamburg (Олександр Гамбург) — bass, vocals (1987-1991)
 Andriy Partyka (Андрій Партика) — guitar (1987—1994)
 Ernest Khreptyk (Ернест «Кабан» Хрептик) — guitar (1991—1992)
 Stepan Koval (Степан Коваль) — wind instruments (1991—1992)
 Bohdan Vatashchuk (Богдан Ватащук) — wind instruments (1991—1992)
 Oleh Kachechka (Олег Качечка) — wind instruments (1991-1992)
 Yuliya Donchenko (Юлія Донченко) — back vocals (1994)
 Bohdan Yura (Богдан Юра) — saxophone (1994—1995)

Discography 
Studio albums
 1989 Vso chotko! (Всьо чотко!)
 1991 My — khloptsi z Bandershtadtu (Ми — хлопці з Бандерштадту) 
 1994 Bulo ne liubyty (Було не любити)
 1996 Shchaslyvoyi dorohy (Bye, bye, myla) (Щасливої дороги! (Бай, бай, мила!))
 2014 Made in Ukraine

Live albums
 2000 Na!Zhyvo (НА!ЖИВО) (live recordings of 1994—1995)
 2006 Live à Bruxelles (live from Brussels, 29 October 1992)
 2006 Vrodylo (Вродило) 2CD, DVD (live from Kyiv, 20 January 2006)

DVD
 2011 Ya vernuvsia domiv (Я вернувся домів. Концерт пам'яті Сергія Кузьмінського) (live tribute)

Other
 2007 Love Story (love songs newly recorded)
 2011 Ya vernuvsia domiv (Я вернувся домів) (tribute)

Videography
 Narkomany na horodi
 Misyachne syaivo tvoho tila
 Zviozdochka moya
 America
 Vso chotko!
 Istoriya odniyei kurvy

Awards
 On February 26, 2018, band received  "YUNA-2018" music award in a special nomination "For special achievements".

Fun facts
Band's songs are heard in the first Ukrainian animated cartoon series "Mykyta the Fox".
Band's songs are heard in Ukrainian comedy TV show Dovhonosyky Show
Hady once had one assistant, who was officially considered a porter, but was actually responsible for preparation of opiates before  concerts 
 Once the drummer of the band Mikhail Lundin, being in a state of narcotic withdrawal, on the train Kyiv - Moscow blocked the way for border guards by emptying between carloads. 
Band's songs are heard in the ICTV series "Cop from the Past" (2020)
Braty Hadiukiny song "Файне місто Тернопіль" (Ternopil Cool City) became an unofficial hymn of Ternopil and even brought the name to the annual rock festival «Файне місто» (Cool City) - even though the song is depicting a life of 17-year old junky who had recently fled away from his parents, now using different types of junk and sleeping with an underaged girl. In his interview Serhiy Kuzminskyi commented this: "If I had known that this [great popularity of the song] would happen, I would have written more decent words. Disgraceful song, I must say…”

References

Links
Official page
Енциклопедія української музики. Брати Гадюкіни.
Lyrics

Soviet rock music groups
Ukrainian rock music groups
1988 establishments in Ukraine
Musical groups established in 1988
Musical groups from Lviv